Anthony Leighton (27 November 1939 – 4 April 1978) was a professional footballer who played as a striker for a number of Yorkshire clubs.

Born in Leeds, Leighton played for Doncaster Rovers, Barnsley, Huddersfield Town and Bradford City.

He managed Bradford Park Avenue from December 1970 until October 1973.

Leighton died of motor neurone disease on 4 April 1978, aged 38.

References

1939 births
1978 deaths
Footballers from Leeds
Football managers from Leeds
English footballers
Association football forwards
Leeds United F.C. players
Doncaster Rovers F.C. players
Barnsley F.C. players
Huddersfield Town A.F.C. players
Bradford City A.F.C. players
English Football League players
English football managers
Bradford (Park Avenue) A.F.C. managers
Deaths from motor neuron disease